Albertin Disseaux (17 November 1914 – 10 July 2002) was a Belgian racing cyclist. He rode in the 1937 Tour de France.

References

1914 births
2002 deaths
Belgian male cyclists
Place of birth missing